Ron McClure (born November 22, 1941) is an American jazz bassist.

Early life
McClure was born in New Haven, Connecticut, United States. He started on piano at age five, and later played accordion and bass. McClure studied privately with Joseph Iadone and, later, with Hall Overton and Don Sebesky. McClure attended the Hartt School of Music, graduating in 1963.

Later life and career
McClure worked in the Buddy Rich Sextet in 1963. He then joined Maynard Ferguson's big band and, afterwards, Herbie Mann in 1964; and then assumed the bass chair in the Wynton Kelly Trio vacated by Paul Chambers in 1965 (playing behind guitarist Wes Montgomery).

From 1966 to 1969, he was a member of Charles Lloyd's "classic quartet" with pianist Keith Jarrett and drummer Jack DeJohnette, which was voted "Group of the Year" in 1967 by Downbeat magazine.

In 1970, with pianist-composer Mike Nock, drummer Eddie Marshall and violinist Michael White, he co-founded the jazz-rock group, the Fourth Way. He also participated in Carla Bley's album, Escalator over the Hill, and worked with saxophonist Joe Henderson.

In 1974, McClure joined Blood, Sweat & Tears, staying until 1975 and performing on three albums: Mirror Image, New City and In Concert.

In the 1980s, he joined Quest, led by saxophonist Dave Liebman, which also included drummer Billy Hart and pianist Richie Beirach. He also recorded a duo album with pianist Michel Petrucciani. McClure's major engagements in the 1990s through the early 2000s were with Lee Konitz, and then with the reassembled Quest.

His solo output include the contributions of John Scofield, John Abercrombie, Vic Juris, Paul Bley, Michael Eckroth, Richie Beirach, and Randy Brecker.

Discography

As leader
 Home Base	(Ode [New Zealand], 1979)
 Descendants (Ken Music [Japan], 1980)
 Yesterday's Tomorrow (EPC/European Music Productions, 1989) with John Abercrombie, Aldo Romano
 McJolt (SteepleChase, 1990) with John Abercrombie
 Never Forget (SteepleChase, 1990) with Eddie Henderson, Vincent Herring
 Inspiration (Ken Music [Japan], 1991)
 Tonite Only (SteepleChase, 1991) with John Abercrombie
 Sunburst (SteepleChase, 1992)
 Inner Account (SteepleChase, 1993)
 Never Always (SteepleChase, 1995)
 Concrete Canyon (SteepleChase, 1996)
 Pink Cloud (Naxos Jazz, 1997)
 Closer to Your Tears (SteepleChase, 1997)
 Dream Team (SteepleChase, 1998)
 Double Triangle (Naxos Jazz, 1999)
 Match Point (SteepleChase, 2002)
 Age of Peace (SteepleChase, 2003)
 Soft Hands (SteepleChase, 2007)
 Wonderland (SteepleChase, 2008) with Harold Danko
 New Moon (SteepleChase, 2009)
 Dedication (SteepleChase, 2011)
 Crunch Time (SteepleChase, 2012)
 Ready or Not (SteepleChase, 2013)
 Hello Stars (McJolt Records, 2016)
 Hope & Knowledge (McJolt Records, 2018)
 Lucky Sunday (SteepleChase, 2019)
 NightQuest (SteepleChase, 2022)

As sideman
With Johnny Alegre
 Johnny Alegre 3 (MCA Music [Philippines], 2009)
With Burak Bedikyan
 Leap of Faith (SteepleChase, 2015)
With Carla Bley
Escalator over the Hill (JCOA, 1971)
With Paul Bley
The Nearness of You (SteepleChase, 1989)
With George Cables
Quiet Fire (SteepleChase, 1994)
With Stanley Cowell
Sienna (SteepleChase, 1989)
With Don Friedman
Almost Everything (SteepleChase, 1995)
With Joe Henderson
If You're Not Part of the Solution, You're Part of the Problem (Milestone, 1970)
With Wynton Kelly Trio
 Full View (Milestone, 1968)
With Lee Konitz
Zounds (Soul Note, 1990)
It's You (SteepleChase, 1996)
Dig-It (SteepleChase, 1999) with Ted Brown
With David Liebman
The Opal Heart (44 Records, 1979)
Doin' It Again (Timeless, 1979)
If They Only Knew (Timeless, 1980)
With Charles Lloyd
Love-In (Atlantic, 1967)
Journey Within (Atlantic, 1967)
Charles Lloyd in the Soviet Union (Atlantic, 1970)
Soundtrack (Atlantic, 1969)
With Karlheinz Miklin
Next Page (SOS Music [Austria], 1991)
Decisions (1993)
Last Waltz (Acoustic Music, 1997)
From Here to There (TCB Records, 2002)
In Between (2004)
With Michel Petrucciani
Cold Blues (OWL, 1985)
With The Pointer Sisters
The Pointer Sisters (Blue Thumb, 1973)
With Julian Priester
Love, Love (ECM, 1973)
With George Russell
Live in an American Time Spiral (Soul Note, 1983)
With Jarmo Savolainen
First Sight (Timeless, 1992)
True Image (A-Records, 1995)
With James Spaulding
The Smile of the Snake (HighNote, 1997)
With Dave Stryker
Strike Zone (SteepleChase, 1991)

References 

1941 births
Living people
Musicians from New Haven, Connecticut
American jazz double-bassists
Male double-bassists
Blood, Sweat & Tears members
University of Hartford Hartt School alumni
Jazz musicians from Connecticut
21st-century double-bassists
21st-century American male musicians
American male jazz musicians
The Fourth Way (band) members
Quest (band) members